Ram Khamhaeng was a Thai king in the Sukhothai period. 

Ram Khamhaeng, Ramkhamhaeng or Ram Kham Haeng may also refer to:

 Ram Khamhaeng inscription, a stone inscription claimed to have been created by Ram Khamhaeng
 Ramkhamhaeng University, a Thai university
 Ramkhamhaeng Road, a road in Bangkok

Human name disambiguation pages